Miyah Watford (born August 3, 1998) is an American professional soccer player who currently plays for ÍBV of the Úrvalsdeild kvenna. She played college soccer at Murray State Racers.

Early years
Watford grew up in Indianapolis, Indiana alongside one sister, Malia Withers, and one brother, Marvin Watford Jr. Shes is the daughter of René and Anthony Withers.

College career
Watford played for the Murray State Racers, finishing her university career with 31 goals and 14 assists in 55 games. She was named the 2019 OVC Offensive Player of the Year and has her place in the record books for her school by breaking the single season record for goals and points.

Professional career

ÍBV, 2020–present
Watford signed her first professional contract with ÍBV following her senior season at Murray State. ÍBV, located in Vestmannaeyjar, Iceland, competes in the Úrvalsdeild kvenna – the top-tier women's professional soccer league in Iceland.

On 15 June 2020, Watford made her Úrvalsdeild kvenna debut against Þróttur Reykjavík and scored her first goal 6 minutes into the game. The game finished in a 4-3 victory with Watford scoring two goals and winning the crucial penalty to win the game which was converted by Fatma Kara.

References

External links
Miyah Watford (@Miyah_watford7) | Twitter
IBV.is

1998 births
Living people
American women's soccer players
Soccer players from Indianapolis
Women's association football forwards
Murray State Racers women's soccer players